Sphaerulina rehmiana is a fungal plant pathogen infecting roses.

References

Fungal plant pathogens and diseases
Rose diseases
rehmiana
Fungi described in 1910